Gentle Words is Japanese singer-songwriter Koda Kumi's ninth domestic solo single. The single charted at No. 15 on Oricon and stayed on the charts for ten weeks. The b-side "Saigo no Ame" (最後の雨 / Last Rain) is a cover of Yasushi Nakanishi's song of the same name.

Information
Gentle Words is Japanese singer-songwriter Koda Kumi's ninth domestic single under the avex sub-label Rhythm Zone. The single peaked low on the Oricon Singles Charts at No. 15, and remained on the chart for ten consecutive weeks.

Despite coming off of the success of real Emotion/1000 no Kotoba, both this single and her last single, Come With Me, failed to break the top ten.

The single did have one b-side, "Saigo no Ame," which was a cover of the song originally released by Yasushi Nakanishi in 1992.

Promotional advertisements
"Gentle Words" was used in the advertisement for SATO Healthcare's sinus gel Stona (ストナ).

Background narration
"I can’t create a hit song on my own . . . I felt depressed a lot." – Koda Kumi

Due to the low chart ranking of the single and its predecessor, COME WITH ME, Koda Kumi fell into a depression, feeling as though she was unable to create a song without a famous composer's help. However, she began to turn her frame of mind around, believing that when she finally made it, people wouldn't think she made it just because of a tie-in, but instead, because she was in the song. She then decided that she would continue and not let anything hold her back.

"I vowed to myself to continue to run towards my dream." – Koda Kumi

Track listing

Sales
Initial week estimate: 9,531
Total estimate: 27,164

Alternate versions
Gentle Words
Gentle Words: Found on the single (2003) and corresponding album Feel My Mind (2004)
Gentle Words [Instrumental]: Found on the single (2003)

Saigo no Ame
Saigo no Ame: Found on the single (2003)
Saigo no Ame [Instrumental]: Found on the single (2003)
Saigo no Ame [Time Heals Version]: Found on BEST ~BOUNCE & LOVERS~ (2007)

References

External links
avex network inc. (2005), Koda Kumi Official Web Site
Oricon Style (2005), Ranking – Oricon Style

Koda Kumi songs
2003 singles
2003 songs
Songs written by Dai Nagao
Songs written by Koda Kumi